Caroline Shaw CBE is a British healthcare administrator.

Caroline Shaw was born in the Lake District and originally worked as a midwife. She graduated from Birmingham University with an MSc degree in Healthcare Policy and Management in 1999.

Shaw was chief executive of the Christie Hospital NHS Foundation Trust, the specialist cancer centre in Manchester, from 2005 to 2014. She was one of the youngest female Chief Executives in the NHS when she was appointed. While at the Christie she oversaw the development of a £35 million patient treatment centre at The Christie and the building of a network of Christie radiotherapy centres. In 2006 Shaw helped launched the Manchester Cancer Research Centre in partnership with Manchester University and Cancer Research UK. In 2011 Shaw was reported to be the 33rd highest paid manager in the NHS.

Caroline Shaw was appointed a Commander of the Order of the British Empire (CBE) in the 2013 New Year Honours for services to the NHS. She was the first-  NHS winner of a First Women Award in 2010, given for her work in improving services for cancer patients. She was chosen as Patron for the 'Network National' for UK business women in 2009, received the North West Inspiring Woman of the Year award in 2007 and Crain's Manchester Businesses Businesswoman of the Year award in 2009.

She was suspended from her duties at Christie Hospital on 19 December 2013 while investigations were conducted as part of a disciplinary process. It was alleged that she had made an improper claim for the payment of expenses for a retreat in Ibiza organised by the Young Presidents' Organization, of which she had become a member with the Trust’s agreement.  She resigned her post in October 2014, having been suspended on full pay for 11 months- amounting to £170,000 and left with another six months salary - just under £100,000.

In November 2014 Shaw was appointed Director of Emergency Patient Pathway at Nottingham University Hospitals NHS Trust. In October 2015 she became the Chief Operating Officer of the service.
In January 2019, Shaw joined the Queen Elizabeth Hospital in King’s Lynn, Norfolk as their Interim CEO.

References

Alumni of the University of Birmingham
Living people
Commanders of the Order of the British Empire
British midwives
Administrators in the National Health Service
English healthcare chief executives
Year of birth missing (living people)